Bor is both a surname and a given name. Notable people with this name include:

Surname
Andy Bor (born 1963), Australian ski coach and sighted guide for visually impaired skiers
Barna Bor (born 1968), Hungarian judoka and Olympics competitor
Dávid Bor (born 1994), Hungarian footballer
Dekel Bor (born ?), Israeli jazz guitarist and composer
Eleanor Bor (1898–1957), British travel writer; wife of Norman Bor
Guy Thornton Bor ( Max Adrian; 1903–1973), Irish actor and singer
Hilda Bor (1910–1993), British classical pianist
Hillary Bor (born 1989), Kenyan-born American track and field athlete
Jamtsyn Bor (born 1958), Mongolian wrestler
Jan Bor (1886–1943), Czech theater director and playwright
Katalin Bor (born 1990), Hungarian swimmer and Olympics competitor
Matej Bor ( Vladimir Pavšič; 1913–1993), Slovene poet, translator, playwright, journalist, and partisan
Milan Bor (1936–1998), Czechoslovakian-born German sound engineer
Modesta Bor (1926–1998), Venezuelan composer
Nathan Bor (1913–1972), American boxer and Olympic medalist
Norman Bor (1893–1972), Irish Botanist; husband of Eleanor Bor
Paulus Bor (1601–1669), Dutch painter
Pieter Bor (1559–1635), Dutch writer and historian
Pnina Bor (1924–2009), Israeli philanthropist and B'nai B'rith official
Vane Bor ( Stevan Živadinović; 1908–1993), Serbian artist
Walter Bor (1916–1999), Austrian-born British urban planner and architect
Zsolt Bor (born 1949), Hungarian physicist

Given name
Bor Pavlovčič (born 1998), Slovenian ski jumper
Bor-ming Jahn (1940–2016), Taiwanese-born French geochemist
Bor S. Luh (1916–2001), Chinese-born American food scientist and educator
Hui Chak Bor (born 1968), Hong Kong cyclist and Olympics competitor
Li Yiu-bor (1909–1976), Hong Kong teacher, publisher, politician, and religious leader

See also
Bór (disambiguation)
BOR (disambiguation)
Bors (disambiguation)
Bors, the elder and the younger, legendary Arthurian knights